Kenneth Alexander (born January 4, 1953) is an American former stock car racing driver, he competed full-time in the NASCAR Southeast Series and the ASA Series before moving up to race part-time in the NASCAR Busch Series.

Racing career
He made eight starts in the Busch Series in 2001 and four starts in 2002. In 2001, he drove seven races for Jay Robinson and one for Tony Hall. Ken Alexander made all his 2002 starts for Hubert Hensley. During the Bristol race in March, Alexander became a major nuisance as he was very slow on the track and caused or got caught up in multiple accidents during the race before finally dropping with 10 to go, doing major damage to the front of his car and breaking the radiator after running into the back of Stacy Compton in an incident that was caused by Greg Biffle turning Kevin Harvick into the wall; Harvick and Biffle would get into it after the race in what would be one of the most notable fights of the season. The bad race also proved to be Alexander's final NASCAR Busch Series start as he hasn't appeared at another NASCAR sanctioned race since.

Motorsports career results

NASCAR
(key) (Bold – Pole position awarded by qualifying time. Italics – Pole position earned by points standings or practice time. * – Most laps led.)

Busch Series

References

External links
 

Living people
1953 births
American Speed Association drivers
People from Anderson, South Carolina
Racing drivers from South Carolina
NASCAR drivers